Zabernovo is a village in Malko Tarnovo Municipality, in Burgas Province, in southeastern Bulgaria. It is situated in Strandzha Nature Park.

Paroria, a forest known for being the 14th-century monastic site of the hesychast Gregory of Sinai, is located just to the west of Zabernovo.

Honours
Zabernovo Bastion on Davis Coast, Antarctica is named after the village.

References

Villages in Burgas Province